The name Flora has been used for seven tropical cyclones worldwide.

In the Atlantic Ocean:
 Hurricane Flora (1955) – A category 2 hurricane, stayed at sea.
 Hurricane Flora (1959) – a category 1 hurricane minimal affected Azores. 
 Hurricane Flora (1963) – is among the deadliest Atlantic hurricanes in recorded history, with a death total of at least 7,193.
The name Flora was later retired and replaced by Fern.

In the Western Pacific Ocean:
 Typhoon Flora (1947) – a powerful category 3 typhoon impact Philippines.

In the Australian Region:
 Cyclone Flora (1964) – a category 3 tropical cyclone (Australian scale) impact in the Gulf of Carpentaria.
 Cyclone Flora (1975) – a Category 2 tropical cyclone (Australian scale) impact Vanuatu and New Caledonia.

In the South-West Indian Ocean:
 Tropical Storm Flora (1962) – a weak tropical storm not make landfall.

Atlantic hurricane set index articles
South-West Indian Ocean cyclone set index articles
Australian region cyclone set index articles